Calcium channel, voltage-dependent, alpha 2/delta subunit 3 is a protein that in humans is encoded by the CACNA2D3 gene on chromosome 3 (locus 3p21.1).

Function 

This gene encodes a member of the alpha-2/delta subunit family, a protein in the voltage-dependent calcium channel complex. Calcium channels mediate the influx of calcium ions into the cell upon membrane polarization and consist of a complex of alpha-1, alpha-2/delta, beta, and gamma subunits in a 1:1:1:1 ratio. Various versions of each of these subunits exist, either expressed from similar genes or the result of alternative splicing. Research on a highly similar protein in rabbit suggests the protein described in this record is cleaved into alpha-2 and delta subunits. Alternate transcriptional splice variants of this gene have been observed but have not been thoroughly characterized.

Clinical significance 

Number of studies reported an association between methylation of the CACNA2D3 gene and cancer.

Breast cancer 

Methylation-dependent transcriptional silencing of CACNA2D3 gene may contribute to the metastatic phenotype of breast cancer. Analysis of methylation in the CACNA2D3 CpG island may have potential as a biomarker for risk of development of metastatic disease.

Gastric cancer 

The loss of CACNA2D3 gene expression through aberrant promoter hypermethylation may contribute to gastric carcinogenesis, and CACNA2D3 gene methylation is a useful prognostic marker for patients with advanced gastric cancer. Physical exercise was correlated with a lower methylation frequency of CACNA2D3.

References

External links

Further reading 

 
 
 
 
 
 
 
 

Ion channels